The Survivors is a 1979 Cuban drama film directed by Tomás Gutiérrez Alea. It was entered into the 1979 Cannes Film Festival. Los Sobrevivientes was preserved by the Academy Film Archive, in conjunction with the Instituto Cubano de Arte e Industria Cinematográfica, in 2017.

Cast
 Enrique Santiesteban - Sebastián Orozco
 Juanita Caldevilla - Doña Lola
 Germán Pinelli - Pascual Orozco
 Ana Viña - Fina Orozco
 Reynaldo Miravalles - Vicente Cuervo
 Vicente Revuelta - Julio Orozco
 Leonor Borrero - Cuca
 Carlos Ruiz de la Tejera - Manuel Orozco
 Yael Teruel - Finita Orozco - niña
 Lili Rentería - Finita Orozco (as Ana Lillian Renteria)
 Francisco Puentes - Julio Orozco - niño
 Patricio Wood - Julio Orozco
 Tony Cortes - Bartolomé Orozco - niño
 Jorge Alí - Bartolomé Orozco (as Jorge Félix Ali)
 Manolito Angueira - Sebastiancillo Orozco

See also 
 List of Cuban films

References

External links

1979 films
1970s Spanish-language films
1979 drama films
Films directed by Tomás Gutiérrez Alea
Cuban drama films